Finch's Quarterly Review is an international luxury magazine which publishes articles about glamour and style, often with a humorous slant. The magazine is primarily aimed at the luxury sector, but also includes coverage of philanthropy, politics, the arts, history and music.  Articles in the publication are often written by society insiders, from a perspective which may not be available in other magazines.  The target audience is people in show business.

History
The magazine was launched in 2008 by Charles Finch and Nick Foulkes. As of May 2012, it had published 20 issues. The Editor-in-Chief is Nick Foulkes.

In 2012 an essay from the magazine, "Jesus was a Commie", was adapted as a film by Matthew Modine.

Each year the magazine holds an event in Cannes called the FQR Filmmakers Dinner during the film festival at the Hotel du Cap which has been sponsored by IWC and Chopard. The guests include well-known producers and directors.

The magazine included a controversial blog called The Princess Diaries, by Elisabeth von Thurn und Taxis.  von Thurn und Taxis wrote about the problems of the wealthy, often contrasting these with the problems of other people.

Editorial 

Contributors to FQR over the years have included Tommy Hilfiger, Sharon Stone, Christian Louboutin,  Tony Hall, Kevin Spacey, John Malkovich, Eric Dane, Bryan Ferry, Nic Roeg, Sophia Loren, Charles Saumarez-Smith, Matthew Modine, Michael Chow, Edward Watson, Elle Macpherson, Emma Thompson and Sir Terence Conran.

Style and production 

FQR's look is that of a broadsheet newspaper, in the fashion of Ritz Magazine of the 70's and early 80's. The production design has been carried out by Nick Foulkes and Art Director Tristram Fetherstonhaugh. Princess Elisabeth von Thurn und Taxis served as Features Editor, followed by Emilia Hungerford. The magazine's current Managing Editor is Tom Chamberlin. The issues themselves range in pagination but are usually kept under 40 pages. Distribution is via subscription.

References

External links
https://web.archive.org/web/20130709151440/http://www.finchsquarterly.com/
http://www.harpersbazaar.co.uk/going-out/celebrities/Charles-Finch-Cannes-Filmmakers-Dinner#slide-4

Fashion magazines published in the United Kingdom
Quarterly magazines published in the United Kingdom
Lifestyle magazines published in the United Kingdom
Magazines established in 2008